Lajos Hanzo FREng is an electronics engineer, Professor and Chair of Telecommunications at the University of Southampton, and a former Editor-in-Chief of IEEE Press.

Education
Lajos was born in Hungary and studied at the Technical University of Budapest, graduating with his master's degree in Electronics in 1976 and his Ph.D. in 1983. In 1980 - 81 he conducted research at the University of Erlangen - Nuremberg in Germany, then returned to Hungary and in 1986 he moved to Southampton University in the UK.

Career
In 1987 he was appointed as a Lecturer/Assistant Prof. at the University of Southampton and in 1998 he was appointed to the Chair of Telecommunications. In 2004, he received his Doctor of Science degree for his thesis based on 11 research monographs and 70 journal papers.

Lajos Hanzo  is a prolific educator and researcher. He has published 2000+ technical papers at IEEE Xplore, and co-authored 19 John Wiley - IEEE Press research monographs.  His research include MIMO, OFDM, Visible Light and Quantum Communications conceived for flawless tele-presence. He is a frequent keynote speaker at IEEE conferences.

He has served several terms on the [Board of VTS Governors] of the IEEE.

Awards
Lajos was elected a Fellow of the Royal Academy of Engineering in 2004. He received the Sir Monty Finiston Medal (IET Achievement Medals) in 2008. He is a Fellow of IEEE (2004), Fellow of IET, and Fellow of EURASIP (2011). He received Honorary Doctorates from the Technical University of Budapest in 2009 and from the University of Edinburgh in 2015. In 2016, he was elected as a Foreign Member of the Hungarian Academy of Sciences. He was bestowed upon the 2022 Eric Sumner Field Award of the IEEE.

Books and papers
Lajos has co-authored 19 books related to generations of wireless communications standards, flawless voice- and video-compression, turbo coding, MC-CDMA, OFDM, MIMO systems, just to name a few. He is an ISI highly cited researcher and the holder of two consecutive European Advanced Fellow Grants stretching over the past decade.

References

External links

Living people
British electronics engineers
Fellows of the Institution of Engineering and Technology
Fellows of the Royal Academy of Engineering
Academics of the University of Southampton
Year of birth missing (living people)
Hungarian engineers